Dr Mohamed Ayub or Dr. Ayub is an Indian politician and president of Peace Party of India. He Is MLA in Sixteenth Legislative Assembly of Uttar Pradesh. Since 2012 he represents Khalilabad (Assembly constituency) in Sant Kabir Nagar district as a member of Peace Party of India.

Early life and career
Dr. Mohammad Ayub was born in Barhalganj, Teh.-Gola, Gorakhpur in 1955 to Aashiq Ali. He studied to become a Master of Surgery in 1985 from Banaras Hindu University Varanasi (M.S.), F.A.I.S. & F.I.C.S. and he was a successful businessman in the medical field.

Career
Dr Ayub fought his maiden election from Khalilabad (Sant Kabir Nagar) assembly seat of Basti division in Uttar Pradesh state assembly election in 2012. After the good performance of party's Lok Sabha 2009 candidate from Sant Kabir Nagar, Dr Ayub won the Khalilabad assembly seat in 2012 by 5392 votes over his rival Mashoor Alam (Bahujan Samaj Party).

Sexual exploitation case
On 25 February 2017, Ayub was booked for allegedly sexually exploiting a young woman who later died from liver and kidney damage. According to the woman's brother, Ayub had brought the girl to Lucknow from Khalilabad on the pretext of providing her better education and promising to make her a doctor. But the case is still going to trial.

References

External links
 http://www.indianexpress.com/news/eye-on-up-polls-dr-ayub-brings-peace-party/803714/
 http://www.milligazette.com/news/1532-assassination-bid-on-dr-ayub-president-peace-party-indian-muslims

Uttar Pradesh politicians
Living people
Year of birth missing (living people)